Harry Roberts (born 13 December 1960 in Lusaka, Northern Rhodesia) is a former South African rugby union player. He was qualified to play for both South Africa and Scotland.

Rugby Union career

Amateur career

In 1987, Roberts moved to Leicester and spent a couple of years at the club.

The following season he played for London Scottish.

Provincial career

Roberts made his debut for Transvaal in 1985 and played 16 matches for Transvaal in 1985 and 1986., after which he returned to Transvaal and played a further 79 matches for the union. He was a member of the Transvaal teams that lost in the Currie Cup finals of 1991 and 1992.

He played for the Scottish Exiles in the Scottish Inter-District Championship.

International career

He was capped by Scotland 'B' to play against Ireland 'B' on 22 December 1990.

Roberts toured with the Springboks to France and England in 1992. He did not play in any test matches on tour, but played in six tour matches and scored one try for the Springboks.

See also
List of South Africa national rugby union players – Springbok no. 573

References

1960 births
Living people
South African rugby union players
South Africa international rugby union players
Golden Lions players
Leicester Tigers players
Alumni of Marondera High School
Sportspeople from Lusaka
Scotland 'B' international rugby union players
London Scottish F.C. players
Rugby union hookers
Scottish Exiles (rugby union) players